Leonard John Fraser (27 June 1951 – 1 January 2007), also known as The Rockhampton Rapist, was an Australian convicted serial killer.

Biography 
Fraser was born in Ingham, Queensland.

Raised in Ingham, Queensland.

Crimes 
Before a life sentence on 7 September 2000 for the abduction, rape and murder of a 9-year-old girl, Keyra Steinhardt, in Rockhampton, Queensland, Leonard Fraser had spent almost 20 of the preceding 22 years behind bars for the rape of women. He even raped a terminally ill cancer patient, with whom he had been living in early 1997. He was subsequently charged with four murders. Police found many trophies of his victims in his flat and ponytails from three different women, which could not be traced to any of his known victims.

Fraser originally confessed to five murders in an apparent deal with police to avoid general population in prison, but one of those victims was 14-year-old Natasha Ryan, who was found to be alive and living secretly with her boyfriend in a nearby town after being listed as a missing person for five years. Although there was an obvious inconsistency with his confessions, his defence did not file for a mistrial. Nor did his defence object to the prosecution using the same confession made in custody, which included the Ryan confession, for three other victims whose remains were found. The Ryan 'murder' was also based on testimony from a fellow prisoner who alleged that Fraser drew detailed maps showing where Ms. Ryan's remains could be located. The judge in the case, Justice Brian Ambrose, heavily criticised the media for commenting on the value of confessions to crimes made to police under duress or to other prisoners while in custody, which might have affected the trial.

In 2003 Fraser was sentenced to three indefinite prison terms for the murders of Beverley Leggo and Sylvia Benedetti, and the manslaughter of Julie Turner in the Rockhampton area in 1998 and 1999. At his trial, the judge described him as a sexual predator who was a danger to the community and his fellow inmates.

Death 
Fraser was being held at the Wolston Correctional Centre and, after complaining of chest pains, he was taken to a secure section of the Princess Alexandra Hospital in Woolloongabba, on 26 December 2006, where he died of a heart attack on 1 January 2007.

Media 
Fraser's murders are the focus of the Crime Investigation Australia series 2 episode "The Predator: Leonard John Fraser" and Crime Stories episode "Leonard Fraser: the Rockhampton Rapist".

See also
List of serial killers by country

References

Bibliography

External links

1951 births
2007 deaths
Australian murderers of children
Australian people convicted of child sexual abuse
Australian people convicted of murder
Australian people who died in prison custody
Australian prisoners sentenced to life imprisonment
Australian rapists
Australian serial killers
Male serial killers
People convicted of murder by Queensland
People from North Queensland
Prisoners sentenced to life imprisonment by Queensland
Prisoners who died in Queensland detention
Serial killers who died in prison custody
Violence against women in Australia